Wiang, Thoeng is a tambon (subdistrict) of Thoeng District, in Chiang Rai Province, Thailand. In 2015 it had a population of 16,765 people.

Administration

Central administration
The tambon is divided into 25 administrative villages (mubans).

Local administration
The area of the subdistrict is shared by two local governments: 
 Subdistrict municipality (Thesaban Tambon) Wiang Thoeng (เทศบาลตำบลเวียงเทิง)
 subdistrict administrative organization (SAO) Wiang (องค์การบริหารส่วนตำบลเวียง)

References

External links
Thaitambon.com on Wiang

Tambon of Chiang Rai province
Populated places in Chiang Rai province